The second season of Burmese competitive reality TV cooking show MasterChef Myanmar ran from July 14, 2019 to November 24, 2019 on MRTV-4. Arkar was the winner of this season. The host of this season was Thazin Nwe Win and the judges were Jean Marc Lemmery, U Ye Htut Win and Daw Phyu Phyu Tin.

Top 20

References

Burmese television series
MasterChef
MasterChef Myanmar